CFX Bank, whose full name is CFX Bank Limited, was a commercial bank in Zimbabwe. It was one of the licensed commercial banks in the country.

History
The bank was founded in 2006, as a 100% subsidiary of CFX Financial Services Limited, its holding company, whose shares trade on the Zimbabwe Stock Exchange. The bank has two (2) affiliated companies: (a) CFX Asset Management and (b) CFX Merchant Bank, both of which are also 100% owned by the holding company. In 2009, as a result of changes in Zimbabwean banking laws, Interfin Holdings Limited, acquired a controlling interest in CFX Financial Services. Subsequently, the holding company was renamed Interfin Financial Services Limited, to reflect the new ownership. The trading symbol for the new bank holding company is: INTERFIN. The Government of Zimbabwe has given formal approval of the takeover of CFX Bank by Interfin. The Reserve Bank of Zimbabwe has also signaled its approval of the merger of the two institutions.

Ownership
CFX Bank was a publicly traded company. The shares of stock of its holding company, Interfin Financial Services Limited are listed on the Zimbabwe Stock Exchange, where they trade under the symbol: INTERFIN. An ownership dispute exists, with the former director of ENG Capital Group claiming that assets were illegally acquired by CFX Bank

The five largest shareholders of record in INTERFIN and thus CFX Bank are:

See also
Interfin Bank
List of banks in Zimbabwe
Reserve Bank of Zimbabwe
Zimbabwe Stock Exchange
Economy of Zimbabwe

References

External links

Listed Companies At Zimbabwe Stock Exchange

Banks of Zimbabwe
Banks established in 2006
Companies listed on the Zimbabwe Stock Exchange
Companies based in Harare